The Officers' Commissions Act 1862 (25 & 26 Vict. c. 4) was an Act of Parliament of the Parliament of the United Kingdom.

It provided that any officer's commission in the British Army could be issued without the royal sign-manual, provided that it was signed by a principal secretary of state and the commander in chief, or an appropriate officer depending on the specific branch of service. For the Royal Marines, a signature from the Admiralty was required.

The Act, whilst amended to reflect changes in the military and political structure since 1862, is still in force.

References

External links
 

United Kingdom Acts of Parliament 1862
1862 in military history
19th-century history of the British Army